NGC 676 is a lenticular Seyfert 2 galaxy about 18.7 Mly away in the constellation Pisces. It can be seen near the star α Piscium. Located close to the celestial equator, it is visible from both hemispheres. BD +04 0244, a star with a visual magnitude of 10.44, is superposed 5.1 arc seconds south-southwest of the nucleus. It is one of the 621 galaxies described in Marat Arakelian's catalog of high-surface-brightness galaxies.

See also 
 Spiral galaxy 
 List of NGC objects (1–1000)

References

External links

Students for the Exploration and Development of Space - NGC 676
Telescopius - NGC 676
SkyMap.org - NGC 676
NGC 676 on SIMBAD

NGC 0676
NGC 0676
0676
006656